Wimbolds Trafford is a hamlet and former civil parish, now in the parish of Mickle Trafford and District, in the unitary authority of Cheshire West and Chester and the ceremonial county of Cheshire, England.

At the 2011 census the civil parish had a population of 212.

History
The present name Wimbolds Trafford comes from Winebald's Trafford, with the latter meaning "valley ford". Winebald (a personal noun) is combined with the Old English words trog (a trough or hollow) and ford (a ford or crossing).

Wimbolds Trafford was recorded in the Domesday Book with a population of three households of "two smallholders and one riders". Consisting of one ploughland under the ownership of Earl Hugh of Chester, it had a taxable value of "1 geld units".

Wimbold Trafford in the early 1870s was described as:

...a township in Thornton-le-Moors parish, Cheshire; 4¼ miles NE of Chester. Acres, 574. Real property, £1,081. Pop., 113. Houses, 18.

Formerly a township in Thornton ancient parish of Eddisbury Hundred, it became a civil parish in 1866. In 1888 part of Bridge Trafford was added to the parish. Further boundary changes occurred on 1 April 1963 with the neighbouring civil parishes of Picton and Wervin.

Governance
Wimbolds Trafford is within the Ellesmere Port and Neston parliamentary constituency. 

The civil parish was abolished in 2015 to form Mickle Trafford and District, part of it also went to Dunham-on-the-Hill and Hapsford. The local parish council meets monthly in nearby Mickle Trafford.

Demography

Population
The current population as recorded by 2011 census is 212 (109 males and 103 females).

Employment

This graph shows clearly occupation data for both males and females in 1881. Work in agriculture is the most common occupation for men, while for women the highest occupation is in the domestic service.

According to the most modern census data (2011) 117 of the residents between 16 and 74 are in employment. The most popular avenue of work being Wholesale and Retail Trade; Repair of Motor Vehicles and Motor Cycles. 15.4% of the working residents work in this sector, the next highest was education at 11.1%.

Landmarks

Trafford Hall was built in 1756 and is designated a Grade II* listed building. 
As of  the venue is used as a National Communities Resource Centre, which is a registered charity offering training and support to those living and working in low-income areas throughout the United Kingdom. Trafford Hall can also be hired out for events, conferences and as a wedding venue.

See also

Listed buildings in Wimbolds Trafford

References

External links

Villages in Cheshire
Former civil parishes in Cheshire
Cheshire West and Chester